Vake Park is a public park in Tbilisi. The park was opened in 1946 and is located in the Vake district of Tbilisi at the western end of Chavchavadze Avenue.

World War II Memorial sits at the top of the hill in the park.

On October 13, 2022, One day after the 2nd stage of restoration completed, Three Teenagers were Electrocuted in the Round Fountain of the park trying to Retrieve their ball, 2 survived but one of them, a 13-year-old girl Marita Reparishvili Died after being taken to the hospital. The Incident Caused Outrage with People Calling for Mayor Kakha Kaladze to Resign and 9 individuals were Arrested for suspected Negligence Resulting in the Death of a Person, The Investigation of the Incident is Currently Ongoing

References

Parks in Tbilisi
Stalinist architecture
Vake, Tbilisi